Tavistock Country Club is a private 18-hole golf club located in Tavistock, New Jersey. On December 14, 1920, the club was formally incorporated, and the course was ready for play on June 22, 1921. The course is nestled between Warwick Road and Interstate 295 in Camden County, New Jersey.

The club is where the modern day snowboard was created by Tom Sims.

Tavistock is part of the smallest municipality in New Jersey by population. The Borough of Tavistock was established in 1921 as the club's original municipality, Haddonfield, did not allow for games to be played on Sunday.

The current (2019) club champion at Tavistock is Jamie Slonis and Mary McGuinness.

References

External links

Golf clubs and courses in New Jersey
Buildings and structures in Camden County, New Jersey
1920 establishments in New Jersey
Tavistock, New Jersey